Midnight Sun is a 2018 American romantic drama film based on the 2006 Japanese film A Song to the Sun. The film was directed by Scott Speer and written by Eric Kirsten, and stars Bella Thorne, Patrick Schwarzenegger, and Rob Riggle. The story is about a teenaged girl with the disease xeroderma pigmentosum, which prevents her from going out into sunlight. When she meets a boy, she struggles to decide whether to tell him about her condition or pretend to live a normal life. Principal photography began on October 12, 2015, in Vancouver. The film was released in the United States on March 23, 2018.

Plot

Sheltered since her early childhood, Katie Price has a rare genetic condition called xeroderma pigmentosum, which prevents an individual from being exposed to direct sunlight. She is housebound during daylight hours and is cared for by her father Jack and best friend Morgan. Katie comes out of the house every night after the sun has set. One night, her long time crush, Charlie, notices her while playing guitar at a train station. Katie leaves suddenly and forgets her notebook, which Charlie keeps. He returns the next day and gives it to Katie when she shows up to retrieve it. He explains to her how he got his injury, preventing him from getting a scholarship to the University of California, Berkeley, before kissing her.

However, Katie has yet to tell Charlie of her condition, despite her father warning her to do so. Charlie takes Katie out for a night to Seattle, where they go to a live show, and Charlie makes Katie play one of her songs on one of the city's streets. Once home, they go swimming out in the lake, and dry off with a fire on the beach. Charlie mentions watching the sunrise, and Katie runs home in fear. Charlie picks her up and quickly drives her there, but she does not make it in time, and is exposed to the sunlight for just a couple of seconds. Katie runs inside, while Morgan and Jack come home soon after. Charlie is still standing at the front door, and Morgan explains Katie's condition to him. Once the doctors run some tests, they come to the conclusion that Katie's brain is contracting, and it is only a matter of time before she dies.

Katie begins to experience twitches in her finger, which prevents her from playing the guitar. She also ignores Charlie's messages, as she does not want to hurt him. Jack eventually convinces Katie to speak to Charlie, who still wants to be with Katie and does not care about her condition. Katie goes to Charlie's swim meet with the Berkeley coach, and they hang out at the house with Morgan and Jack. Charlie takes Katie out one night, and surprises her by booking a recording session, where she sings a song she wrote for him. Soon after, while hanging out at her house, Charlie mentions that he has to visit the boat for the last time, which he has been hired to take care of the whole summer. Katie, fearing that she is going to die, remembers the time Charlie told her that he wished they could sail together, and convinces Jack to let her go with Charlie, despite it being during the day. Katie sails with Charlie, feels the sunlight, and spends her final moments with him, dying shortly thereafter.

Some time later, Charlie goes to Katie's house, where he bids farewell to Jack as he is going to pursue his swimming dreams. Jack tells Charlie that Katie wanted him to keep the notebook. Charlie is setting out, when he listens to Katie's song on the radio and reads the heartfelt message which Katie wrote for him in the notebook. In the letter, Katie tells Charlie to watch for the new things which are coming his way and to look up in the sky and to always remember that she loves him.

Cast
 Bella Thorne as Katherine "Katie" Price
 Ava Dewhurst as young Katie
 Patrick Schwarzenegger as Charles "Charlie" Reed
 Rob Riggle as Jack Price
 Quinn Shephard as Morgan
 Audrey Smallman as young Morgan
 Suleka Mathew as Dr. Paula Fleming
 Nicholas Coombe as Garver
 Ken Tremblett as Mark Reed
 Jennifer Griffin as Barb Reed
Tiera Skovbye as Zoe Carmichael
 Jaeda Lily Miller as young Zoe 
 Austin Obiajunwa as Owen
 Alex Pangburn as Wes
 Paul McGillion as Blake Jones

Production 
On June 22, 2015, it was announced that Scott Speer would next direct a young adult romantic drama film, Midnight Sun, based on the script by Eric Kirsten, which would star Patrick Schwarzenegger as Charlie and Bella Thorne as Katie. The film is based on the 2006 Japanese film of same name. It was financed by Boies / Schiller Film Group, and produced by John Rickard and Zack Schiller. On October 9, 2015, Rob Riggle joined the film to play Katie's father, Jack.

Filming
Principal photography on the film began on October 12, 2015, in Vancouver, British Columbia.

Soundtrack

Midnight Sun (Original Motion Picture Soundtrack) is the film's soundtrack album. It was released on March 16, 2018 through Lakeshore Records.

The album was preceded by two singles—"Burn So Bright" and 
"Walk with Me".

Release history

Release
In October 2016, Open Road Films acquired distribution rights to the film. They initially scheduled it for July 14, 2017, before setting it for March 23, 2018.

Box office
Midnight Sun grossed $9.6 million in the United States and Canada, and $17.8 million in other territories, for a total worldwide gross $27.4 million.

In the United States, Midnight Sun was released alongside Pacific Rim Uprising, Sherlock Gnomes, Unsane and Paul, Apostle of Christ, and was projected to gross around $5 million from 2,173 theaters in its opening weekend. It ended up debuting to $4 million, finishing 10th at the box office. It fell 54% to $1.8 million in its second week.

Critical response
The website's critical consensus reads, "Midnight Sun is a typically manipulative and contrived teen romance that's unfortunately distinguished by its offensively inaccurate portrayal of a real-life disease." On Metacritic, the film has a weighted average score of 38 out of 100, based on 14 critics, indicating "generally unfavorable reviews." Audiences polled by CinemaScore gave the film an average grade of "A−" on an A+ to F scale.

Accolades

References

External links 
 
 
 Midnight Sun at The Numbers
 

2018 films
2018 romantic drama films
2010s teen drama films
2010s teen romance films
American remakes of Japanese films
American romantic drama films
American teen drama films
American teen romance films
Films about cancer
Films about death
Films about diseases
Films about guitars and guitarists
Films directed by Scott Speer
Films set in Seattle
Films shot in Vancouver
Films produced by Zack Schiller
2010s English-language films
2010s American films